Loughanstown is a townland in County Westmeath, Ireland.

Loughanstown is one of 8 townlands of the civil parish of Portnashangan in the barony of Corkaree in the Province of Leinster. 
The southern boundary of the townland includes the majority of Scragh Bog.

The neighbouring townlands are: Down and Rathlevanagh to the north, Garrysallagh to the east, Ballynagall to the south and Portnashangan to the west.

In the 1911 census of Ireland there were 12 houses and 50 inhabitants in the townland.

References

External links
Loughanstown at the IreAtlas Townland Data Base
Loughanstown at Townlands.ie
Loughanstown at Logainm.ie

Townlands of County Westmeath